This is a demography of the population of Aruba including population density, ethnicity, education level, health of the populace, economic status, religious affiliations and other aspects of the population.

Having poor soil and aridity, Aruba was detached from plantation economics and the slave trade. In 1515, the Spanish transported the entire population to Hispaniola to work in the copper mines; most were allowed to return when the mines were tapped out. The Dutch, who took control a century later, left the Arawaks to graze livestock, using the island as a source of meat for other Dutch possessions in the Caribbean. The Arawak heritage is stronger on Aruba than on most Caribbean islands.

The population is estimated to be 75% mixed European/Amerindian, 15% Black and 10% other ethnicities. Although no full-blooded Aboriginals remain, the features of half of the islanders clearly indicate their genetic Arawak heritage. The population is descended from Caquetio Indians, Afro-Caribbeans, Dutch, Spanish, Italians and to a lesser extent of Indo-Caribbeans, Portuguese, English, French, and Filipino diaspora. Recently, there has been substantial immigration to the island from neighboring mainland American and Caribbean nations, possibly attracted by the higher paid jobs. In 2007, new immigration laws were introduced to help control the growth of the population by restricting foreign workers to a maximum of three years residency on the island. Demographically, Aruba has felt the impact of its proximity to Venezuela. Many of Aruba's families are descended from Venezuelan immigrants. There is a seasonal increase of Venezuelans living in second homes. As Aruba has a little proximity to Colombia, Colombian residents and their children are found here. Descendants of Indian and Javanese contract workers also live in Aruba.

The two official languages are the Dutch language and the predominant, national language Papiamento, which is classified as a creole language. This creole language is formed primarily from 16th century Portuguese, and several other languages. Spanish and English are also spoken. Islanders can often speak four or more languages.

Many people in the Aruba island culture are multilingual, meaning they can speak more than two or three languages. Languages in this culture are known to be mainly Spanish and English, but also include languages such as Dutch, Portuguese and a local language known as Papiamento. The Leeward islands also known as the (ABC) islands are Aruba, Bonaire, Curaçao. All three islands include the languages listed above.

Children in Aruba are known to start school by the age of four and are commonly known to be multilingual by this time. Although main languages for Aruba are Papiamento and Dutch, English is taught through education when reaching the sixth grade. 

Roman Catholicism is the dominant religion, practiced by about 75% of the population. Various Protestant denominations are also present on the island.

Population

The population is of mixed ancestry, including Caquetio Indians, Africans, and Europeans. Between 1985 and 1987, the population declined due to emigration, but in 1990 this trend was reversed due to the development of the oil industry.

Vital statistics

Structure of the population

Structure of the population (01.07.2013) (Estimates) :

Ethnic groups

The population is estimated to be 75% mixed European/Amerindian, 15% Black and 10% other ethnicities.

In 2019, recently arrived Venezuelan refugees were estimated to number around 17,000, accounting for some 15% of the island’s population.

Languages

Religions

References

 
Society of Aruba